Sidney Albritton (born September 12, 1971) is an American politician who served in the Mississippi State Senate from the 40th district from 2004 to 2012.

References

1971 births
Living people
Republican Party Mississippi state senators